Kaun? is a 1999 Indian Hindi-language psychological suspense thriller film directed by Ram Gopal Varma, written by Anurag Kashyap and starring Urmila Matondkar, Manoj Bajpayee and Sushant Singh. It was shot in 15 days. The film was dubbed into Telugu as Yevaru?.  The film was remade into Kannada as Shock (2010).

Plot
On a gloomy night, a scared young woman  talks to her parents on the telephone, enquiring about when they will be back home. As she watches the news of a serial killer at large, the doorbell rings. The man outside identifies himself as Sameer Purnavale, claiming to be a business partner of the home owner, Mr. Malhotra. The woman is reluctant to open the door, due to the news of a killer on the loose. She says that the house doesn't belong to Mr. Malhotra, but instead to a Mr. Gupta. 
Believing that there has been a misunderstanding, Sameer persistently rings the doorbell even after the woman tells him that she won't let him in. To scare him away, the woman lies by saying that her husband is sleeping upstairs. Sameer says that he has indeed seen a man in the house, and requests to talk to him. Upon hearing this and a subsequent noise from within the house, the woman becomes scared and runs outside. Sameer then takes the woman back inside, reassuring her that he will protect her.

Due to a sudden power cut, the woman goes to the kitchen to look for candles, but instead finds her dead pet cat. Terrified, she runs to the door in a panic, only to find another man who is holding a gun. The man identifies himself as Inspector Qureshi and calls the police station for help. 
Sameer and the woman are suspicious of Qureshi, and two men then get into a fight. During the struggle the woman gets hold of Qureshi's gun, forcing him to reveal that he is not actually a policeman, but a thief. The woman telephones her mother and asks her to contact the police.

Another struggle occurs, and Sameer gravely injures Qureshi, thinking that he is the serial killer. He picks up the telephone to call the police, however he finds that it is not working. Confused, he asks the woman to hide somewhere safe inside the house while he tries to fix the phone. The doorbell rings and Sameer answers. He calls out to the woman, saying that there was a man asking for Mr. Malhotra, but earlier she had insisted that the house belongs to Mr. Gupta. 
Bewildered, he searches for her in the attic, and stumbles upon a dead body, identifying it as that of Mr. Malhotra. The woman attacks him and they begin to struggle, until Sameer is suddenly stabbed by Qureshi, who believes that he is the killer. Whilst he checks on Sameer's body, the woman begins humming and stabs the thief to death.

The next day, the woman begins to remove the bodies, clean up the house, rearrange the furniture and proceeds to "talk" to her mother using the disconnected telephone, revealing her to be the serial killer. The doorbell rings and there is another man at the door, asking for Mr. Malhotra. The woman then turns to the audience and flashes an evil smile.

There are many mysterious elements in the film which remain unsolved. For instance, the murderer of the cat is never known in the film which adds to its suspense even more. Additionally, it was never known how the woman was committing so many murders in an unknown house which belongs to some Mr. Malhotra.

Cast
 Urmila Matondkar as a nameless woman referred to as Ma'am.
 Manoj Bajpayee as Sameer A. Purnavale
 Sushant Singh as a thief who is initially presented as Inspector Quresh's false name.

Reception
Anupama Chopra in her review for India Today stated, "Relentlessly experimental, he moved from the MTV love story Rangeela to the spoof-gone-poof Daud to the gritty underworld saga Satya without a pause. In Kaun, Varma takes a shot at an Ittefaq-style songless suspense thriller and almost pulls it off." Suparn Verma of Rediff said, "The film starts with a big scare that leaves you feeling silly and, slowly, as the momentum picks up, it draws you in. You prepare for the worst, and end up jumping at shadows. Though the climax is a little long-drawn and leaves you with some unanswered questions, it delivers the required punch."

According to the Hindustan Times, Kaun enjoys a near cult status today. An English version of the film Who's There was released online in 2014.

Even after two decades of the release; Kaun is popular among movie fans who follow thriller-horror genre. The main element that makes this movie alive is the screenplay and characters of it, especially the one played by Urmila Matondkar.

References

External links

1990s avant-garde and experimental films
1990s Hindi-language films
1990s psychological thriller films
1990s horror thriller films
1999 films
Films directed by Ram Gopal Varma
Films scored by Sandeep Chowta
Films with screenplays by Anurag Kashyap
Hindi films remade in other languages
Indian avant-garde and experimental films
Indian haunted house films
1990s psychological horror films
Indian psychological horror films
Indian psychological thriller films
Indian serial killer films
1990s serial killer films